The 2018 Singapore Grand Prix (officially the Formula 1 2018 Singapore Airlines Singapore Grand Prix) was a Formula One motor race held on 16 September 2018 at the Marina Bay Street Circuit in Marina Bay, Singapore. The race was the 15th round of the 2018 Formula One World Championship and marked the 19th running of the Singapore Grand Prix and the 11th time the race had been held at Marina Bay.

Mercedes driver Lewis Hamilton entered the round with a 30-point lead over Sebastian Vettel in the Drivers' Championship. In the World Constructors' Championship, Mercedes led Ferrari by 25 points. Hamilton won the race from pole position to further extend his championship lead, ahead of Max Verstappen and Vettel.

Qualifying

Race 
Lewis Hamilton won the race to further strengthen his lead in the Championship after Vettel finished 3rd, thus losing further ground to Hamilton, Max Verstappen managed 2nd place. On the first lap with the two Force India cars colliding with Esteban Ocon ending up in the wall after hitting his teammate Perez, bringing out the Safety Car.

Race classification

Notes 
  – Romain Grosjean received a 5-second time penalty for ignoring blue flags.

Championship standings after the race 

Drivers' Championship standings

Constructors' Championship standings

 Note: Only the top five positions are included for both sets of standings.

References

Singapore
Grand Prix
Singapore Grand Prix
Singapore Grand Prix